Shenandoah River Raymond R. "Andy" Guest Jr. State Park, known generally as Shenandoah River State Park, is a state park near the town of Bentonville, Virginia, United States. The park was established in 1994, and covers  along the South Fork Shenandoah River. It was named for Virginia Delegate Andy Guest, long a resident of the area.

See also
List of Virginia state parks

References

External links

Virginia Department of Conservation and Recreation: Shenandoah River Raymond R. Andy Guest Jr. State Park

State parks of Virginia
State parks of the Appalachians
Parks in Warren County, Virginia
Protected areas established in 1994
1994 establishments in Virginia
Shenandoah River